At least four British ships of the Pacific Steam Navigation Company have been named SS Oropesa.

  – 1894 ship that served as an armed merchant cruiser during World War I before being sunk in 1917.
  – 1919 ocean liner that served during World War II before she was sunk in 1941.
  – A ship transferred from Shaw, Savill & Albion Line to PSNC and renamed Oropesa in 1968. 
  –1978 ship transferred from PSNC to Shaw, Savill & Albion in 1982.

Ship names